Joakim Eriksson (born June 22, 1976) is a retired Swedish professional ice hockey player and current general manager of the Djurgårdens IF of the Swedish Hockey League. He has previously played for SHL teams Djurgårdens IF, Linköpings HC and Södertälje SK. Eriksson also played in Finland for Espoo Blues and HIFK in the SM-liiga.

References

External links 
 

1979 births
Djurgårdens IF Hockey players
Espoo Blues players
HIFK (ice hockey) players
Linköping HC players
Living people
Södertälje SK players
Swedish ice hockey centres
Swedish expatriate ice hockey players in Finland
People from Södertälje
Sportspeople from Stockholm County